Giuditta del Vecchio is an Italian actress, known for her roles in the 1992 Canadian film Léolo and the 1996 Italian film The Nymph. Del Vecchio is featured prominently on the cover of the 1996 re-release of the album Tiger Bay by the English band Saint Etienne.

Filmography
 Snack Bar Budapest (1988)
 Disperatamente Giulia (1989)
 Quiet Days in Clichy (1990)
 Léolo (1992)
 The Nymph (1996)
 Il dolce rumore della vita (1999)

References

External links
 

20th-century Italian actresses
Italian film actresses
Living people
Year of birth missing (living people)